"Plain Sailing" is the debut solo single by English singer-songwriter Tracey Thorn.

Overview 
The original version appeared on Thorn's first solo album A Distant Shore in 1982.  It was re-recorded and released as Thorn's first single on 7" vinyl later that year.  The B-side "Goodbye Joe" is a cover version of a song by fellow Cherry Red Records recording artists Monochrome Set.

The re-recorded version of "Plain Sailing" was included on the Cherry Red Pillows & Prayers compilation album.

The single sleeve featured the Robert Doisneau photograph Le baiser de l'hôtel de ville (Kiss by the Hôtel de Ville) and hand-lettering by Thorn herself.

Thorn did not release another solo single until "It's All True" 25 years later.

In June 2010, Thorn performed "Plain Sailing" live for the first time in nearly 30 years, during an appearance on the NPR programme World Cafe.

Track listing

7 inch single 
 "Plain Sailing"
 "Goodbye Joe"

References 

1982 songs
1982 debut singles
Tracey Thorn songs
Songs written by Tracey Thorn
Cherry Red Records singles